This is a list of singles that charted in the top ten of the Billboard Hot 100 during 1999.

Whitney Houston and Faith Evans each had three top-ten hits in 1999, tying them for the most top-ten hits during the year.

Top-ten singles
Key
 – indicates single's top 10 entry was also its Hot 100 debut

1998 peaks

2000 peaks

See also
1999 in music
List of Billboard Hot 100 number-one singles of 1999
Billboard Year-End Hot 100 singles of 1999

References

General sources

Joel Whitburn Presents the Billboard Hot 100 Charts: The Nineties
Joel Whitburn Presents the Billboard Hot 100 Charts: The 2000s
Additional information obtained can be verified within Billboard's online archive services and print editions of the magazine.

1999
United States Hot 100 Top 10